Cocheras is a station of line 1 of the metro. It is located in the intersection of Águila Marina and Águila de Oro streets, in the neighborhood of Cerro del Águila. Cocheras is an underground type station, situated between La Plata and Guadaíra on the same line. It was opened on 2 April 2009.

See also
 List of Seville metro stations

References

External links 
  Official site.
 History, construction details and maps.

Seville Metro stations
Railway stations in Spain opened in 2009